HUTO or Huto may refer to:

The Huto and Kamarband Caves, archaeological sites in Iran
HUTO, the IACO code of Tororo Airport, located in Uganda
The Heart of the Universe, a fictional energy source in the Marvel Universe